Pussy versus Putin is a 2013 Russian documentary film by the film collective Gogol's Wives chronicling the history of the group Pussy Riot and their struggle with the political regime in Russia. The film received the NTR IDFA Award for Best Mid-Length Documentary at the 2013 International Documentary Film Festival Amsterdam.

The one-hour film includes sequences in which group members discuss their political aims, footage of their guerrilla-style performances during the run-up to the 2012 Russian presidential election as well as the intimidation and physical harassment they face, shot from behind bars and inside prison vans.

See also
Pussy Riot: A Punk Prayer, another 2013 documentary about Pussy Riot

References

External links
 
 Pussy vs. Putin at the ovideo.ru 
 Russian film about the band Pussy Riot received the award in Amsterdam
 Review of Anna Narinskaya
 Review of Marat Gelman
 Pussy vs. Putin at the idfa.nl

2013 films
Documentary television films
Russian documentary films
2013 documentary films
Films shot in Moscow
Russian independent films
Documentary films about punk music and musicians
2010s Russian-language films
Pussy Riot
Documentary films about feminism
Films about activists
Documentary films about women in music
2013 independent films